The 8th government of Turkey (1 March 1935 – 1 November 1937) was a government in the history of Turkey. It is also called the seventh İnönü government.

Background 
After the elections held on 8 February 1935, İsmet İnönü of the Republican People's Party (CHP) founded his cabinet.

The government
In the list below, the  cabinet members who served only a part of the cabinet's lifespan are shown in the column "Notes".

Aftermath
In 1937, there were certain issues on which the president Mustafa Kemal Atatürk and İsmet İnönü disagreed. According to Şevket Süreyya Aydemir, during the Nyon Conference  ( 10–14 September 1937) in which Turkey participated, the disagreement around foreign politics became evident. On 25 October, İsmet İnönü resigned, and Celal Bayar, who was the Minister of Economy in İnönü's government, was appointed as the new prime minister by President Atatürk.

References

08
Republican People's Party (Turkey) politicians
1935 establishments in Turkey
1937 disestablishments in Turkey
Cabinets established in 1935
Cabinets disestablished in 1937
Members of the 8th government of Turkey
5th parliament of Turkey
Republican People's Party (Turkey)